Naomi Mulitauaopele (born March 6, 1976) is a former professional basketball player.

High school
Mulitauaopele played basketball at Chief Sealth International High School in Seattle, Washington. Coming out of high school, she was considered the state's top player.

Career stats

WNBA

Source

Regular season

|-
| 2000 || Utah || 22 || 3 || 13.2 || .594 || .667 || .750 || 1.5 || .3 || .2 || .3 || 1.4 || 4.5
|}

International career
After the WNBA, Mulitauaopele played professionally in Turkey, Korea, and Spain.

Personal life
Mulitauaopele is the niece of Manu Tuiasosopo, a former NFL player.

References

External links
Naomi Mulitauaopele-Tagaleo’o
WNBA.com: Naomi Mulitauaopele Player Info

1976 births
Living people
American women's basketball players
Centers (basketball)
Samoan women's basketball players
Basketball players from Seattle
Stanford Cardinal women's basketball players
Utah Starzz draft picks
Utah Starzz players